Crystal G. McKenzie is a designer and president of Crystal McKenzie, Inc. A graduate of the Cooper Union, she also studied at the Universita Cattolica di Milano. McKenzie is married to Brian Jones. She was named the US Chamber of Commerce's "Woman Business Owner of the Year" in 1983.

References 

Living people
American designers
Year of birth missing (living people)